is a Japanese professional golfer.

Yoneyama was born in  Kanagawa Prefecture.

Yoneyama has won three tournaments on the Japan Golf Tour and featured in the top 100 of the Official World Golf Ranking. His most successful year was 1999 when he won three times and finished tied 15th in The Open Championship.

Professional wins (6)

Japan Golf Tour wins (3)

*Note: The 1999 Hisamitsu-KBC Augusta was shortened to 54 holes due to weather.

Japan Golf Tour playoff record (1–1)

Japan PGA Senior Tour wins (3)
2017 Fancl Classic, Hiroshima Senior Golf Tournament
2018 Japan PGA Senior Championship

Results in major championships

Note: Yoneyama only played in The Open Championship.
"T" = tied

Team appearances
Alfred Dunhill Cup (representing Japan): 1993, 1999

References

External links

Japanese male golfers
Japan Golf Tour golfers
Asian Games medalists in golf
Asian Games silver medalists for Japan
Golfers at the 1986 Asian Games
Medalists at the 1986 Asian Games
Sportspeople from Kanagawa Prefecture
1965 births
Living people